The Abbey of Orosh (also known as Mirditë Abbey or St. Alexander Oroshi) was a territorial Benedictine abbey at Orosh in the region of Mirdita, Albania. It was destroyed during the communist era and now rebuilt, dedicated to the martyr St. Alexander.

History
By papal decree of 25 October 1888, this abbey with its two affiliated parishes, together with five other parishes in the Diocese of Lezhë (Alessio) were removed from the jurisdiction of the Bishop of Lezhë.

In 1890 three parishes from the Diocese of Sapë were added to the territorial Abbey of Orosh, and, in 1894, five more parishes from Lezhë were added.

In the early 20th century, Catholics numbered 16,550 in Albania, being under the care of secular and regular clergy. The abbot was chosen from among the secular clergy. The abbot, Mgr. Primus Docchi, who resided at Orosh was born at Bulgëri, 7 February 1846, and studied at the Propaganda College in Rome. The Franciscans had a parish and a hospital at Gomsiqe.

Source and External links 
 

Territorial abbeys
Benedictine monasteries in Albania
Christian monasteries in Albania
Demolished buildings and structures in Albania
Buildings and structures in Mirditë